Gazzolo is a surname of Italian origin. Notable people with the surname include:

 Lauro Gazzolo (1900–1970), Italian actor and voice actor
 Nando Gazzolo (1928–2015), Italian actor and voice actor

Italian-language surnames